Feskekörka (standard: Fiskkyrkan, "fish church") is an indoor fish market in Gothenburg, Sweden, which got its name from the building's resemblance to a Neo-gothic church. It opened on 1 November 1874, and was designed by the city architect Victor von Gegerfelt. Feskekörka is an institution in Gothenburg as well as a tourist magnet, housing one of the city's oldest trades, fishing.

Apart from a fish market, there is also a fish and seafood restaurant in the building.

Notes

External links

Fish markets
Retail markets in Sweden
Listed buildings in Gothenburg